Spiralothelphusa is a genus of freshwater crabs in the family Gecarcinucidae. It contains these species, all of which are included on the IUCN Red List:

Species

(LC: least concern; EN: endangered; DD: data deficient)

References

Gecarcinucidae
Fauna of South Asia
Taxonomy articles created by Polbot